Thaumastus crenellus is a species of  tropical air-breathing land snail, a pulmonate gastropod mollusk in the family Megaspiridae.

Distribution 

 Peru

References

External links 
 Thaumastus crenellus in Comparative Toxicogenomics Database

Megaspiridae
Gastropods described in 1867